Albert Wheeler Coffrin (December 21, 1919 – January 13, 1993) was a United States district judge of the United States District Court for the District of Vermont.

Education and career

Born in Burlington, Vermont, Coffrin received an Artium Baccalaureus degree from Middlebury College in 1941 and was a lieutenant in the United States Navy during World War II, from 1942 to 1945. He received a Bachelor of Laws from Cornell Law School in 1947, entering private practice in Burlington from 1947 to 1951. He again served in the Navy during the Korean War, from 1951 to 1952, thereafter returning to private practice in Burlington until 1972.

Federal judicial service

On May 3, 1972, Coffrin was nominated by President Richard Nixon to a seat on the United States District Court for the District of Vermont vacated by Judge Bernard Joseph Leddy. Coffrin was confirmed by the United States Senate on June 8, 1972, and received his commission the next day. He served as Chief Judge from 1983 to 1988, assuming senior status on January 31, 1989, and serving in that capacity until his death on January 13, 1993, in Burlington. He was buried at Burlington's Lakeview Cemetery.

References

External links
 
 Albert W. Coffrin, Federal Judge, 73, New York Times, January 16, 1993

1919 births
1993 deaths
People from Burlington, Vermont
Military personnel from Vermont
20th-century American lawyers
20th-century American judges
Judges of the United States District Court for the District of Vermont
Vermont lawyers
United States district court judges appointed by Richard Nixon
United States Navy officers
United States Navy personnel of World War II
United States Navy personnel of the Korean War
Middlebury College alumni
Cornell Law School alumni
Burials at Lakeview Cemetery (Burlington, Vermont)